Šiaulių bankas is a commercial bank in Lithuania.

The company is established in 1992.

 the largest shareholder of the company's shares was European Bank for Reconstruction and Development (EBRD), owing 26% of the company's shares.

Since 1994 (in Secondary List) and since 2006 (in Main List), the company is listed in Nasdaq Vilnius.

References

External links
 

Banks of Lithuania
Companies based in Šiauliai